Graphosoma semipunctatum is a species of true bug living exclusively in the Mediterranean region. The form living on the island of Crete has sometimes been given the name G. creticum.

It is very close to Graphosoma italicum. It can be distinguished from G. italicum by black dots along the pronotum instead of lines, and the mostly orange legs.

They are found abundantly on plants in the family Apiaceae. Its red color serves to warn its predators that it is not palatable.

References 

Podopinae
Insects described in 1775
Taxa named by Johan Christian Fabricius